The , also known as the Miyanomori-Schanze is a ski jumping venue located in the Miyanomori area in Chūō-ku, Sapporo, Hokkaidō, Japan. The stadium has hosted a number of winter sports events including 1972 Winter Olympics and FIS Nordic World Ski Championships 2007.

History 
It was built in 1969 in order to accommodate the Ski jumping (Normal hill) and Nordic combined of the 1972 Winter Olympics; the ski jumping competition was held along with the Okurayama Ski Jump Stadium. The facility has hosted some events of the FIS Nordic World Ski Championships 2007, in addition to many stages of the World Cup Nordic combined and World Cup ski jump.

Overview 
At the time of the Olympics the ski jump had a height of 70 metres; It was refurbished and now has one of 90 metres, which is a normal ski jump (HS 100). The official record of 102.5 m distance, was established by the Polish Adam Małysz  when he became world champion in 2007, although an unofficial 106 m was achieved by the  German Eric Frenzel in the same year. The female record 100 m, belongs to Norwegian Maren Lundby (15-01-2017)

Access 
 JR Bus: from Maruyama Bus Terminal (Maruyama-Kōen Station, Tōzai Line) to Miyanomori Schanze Bus stop, 10 minutes walking distance.

External links 
 Sapporo Skiclub
 Miyanomori Ski Jump

Buildings and structures in Chūō-ku, Sapporo
Venues of the 1972 Winter Olympics
Sports venues in Sapporo
Ski jumping venues in Japan
Olympic ski jumping venues
Olympic Nordic combined venues
2017 Asian Winter Games Venues